Pachystachys lutea, known as the golden shrimp plant or lollipop plant, is a tropical, soft-stemmed evergreen shrub between 0.5 and 2.5 meters tall, native to Peru. The zygomorphic, long-throated, short-lived white flowers emerge sequentially from overlapping bright yellow bracts on racemes that are produced throughout the warm months.

The Latin specific epithet lutea means “yellow”.

It is cultivated as an ornamental, but in cold temperate regions it requires protection from temperatures below . It has won the Royal Horticultural Society’s Award of Garden Merit.

References

Acanthaceae
Flora of Peru